Kinabaluchloa is a genus of Southeast Asian bamboos in the grass family.

Species
 Kinabaluchloa nebulosa K.M.Wong - Sabah, Brunei
 Kinabaluchloa wrayi (Stapf) K.M.Wong  - Peninsular Malaysia, Thailand, Vietnam

References

Bambusoideae
Bambusoideae genera
Flora of Borneo
Flora of Peninsular Malaysia
Flora of Thailand
Flora of Vietnam